Sandeman Tangi is a village and union council of Ziarat District in the Balochistan province of Pakistan. It is 4 km from Ziarat and contains a dramatic waterfall cascading down the rocks which is an attraction for visitors. The great personality Balochistan Malik Momen Khan Esakhail was born in Killi Sandman Tangi. He was the tribal leader of the Esakhail Sanerzai. He passed all his life in the development of his tribe and Ziarat valley.
The waterfall was earlier known as Droond Tangai. Many believed that there live ghosts. But afterwards, it was named after Sir Robert Sandeman.

References

Populated places in Ziarat District
Union councils of Balochistan, Pakistan